Cynthia Lillian Lui (born 17 February 1977) is an Australian politician. She has been the Australian Labor Party member for Cook in the Queensland Legislative Assembly since 2017. Originally from Yam Island in the Torres Strait, Lui is the first Torres Strait Islander to be elected to any parliament. She worked as a community worker in Cairns to win internally as a representative for Cook, she then went on to secure her place within the Labor Party as the preferred candidate. Lui gave her maiden speech in the Queensland Parliament on 15 February 2018.

References

Parliamentary Profile

1977 births
Living people
Members of the Queensland Legislative Assembly
Australian Labor Party members of the Parliament of Queensland
Indigenous Australian politicians
Torres Strait Islanders
Women members of the Queensland Legislative Assembly
21st-century Australian politicians
21st-century Australian women politicians